Dowlahtu (also Romanized as Dowlahtū; also known as Dolatū and Dowlatū) is a village of Mamash Tribe Rural District, Vazineh District, Sardasht County, West Azerbaijan Province, Iran. At the 2006 census, its population was 678, in 103 families.

References 

Populated places in Sardasht County